The fifth and final season of Doctor Doctor (known internationally as The Heart Guy), an Australian drama television series, premiered on Nine Network on 28 April 2021. The season consists of 8 episodes.

Season five will feature several new cast additions; including Zoe Ventoura, Lincoln Younes, Darren McMullen, John Waters, Chantelle Jamieson, Rishikesh Shukre and Contessa Treffone.

Premise
The town of Whyhope is in crisis; with the recent bushfires and the COVID-19 pandemic, things are set to escalate. Hugh has decided the time has come to return to Sydney and resume his career as a heart surgeon, that is until a number of complications begin to surface, bringing his plans to a halt.

Cast

Main
 Rodger Corser as Hugh Knight 
 Nicole da Silva as Charlie Knight (née Pereira)
 Ryan Johnson as Matt Knight
 Tina Bursill as Meryl Knight
 Hayley McElhinney as Penny Cartwright
 Chloe Bayliss as Hayley Mills Knight
 Matt Castley as Ajax Cross Knight
 Belinda Bromilow as Betty Bell
 Charles Wu as Ken Liu
 Chantelle Jamieson as Sharna Bahit

Recurring
 Patrick Wilson as Rod Eagle
 Zoe Ventoura as Kassie
 Darren McMullen as Wes
 Coco Jack Gilles as Larry
 Jackie Hamilton as Sam
 Lincoln Younes as Tom 
 John Waters as Michael
 Contessa Teffone as Melody
 Winta McGrath as Floyd Cartwright

Guest
 Marshall Napier as Bill
 Jay Laga'aia as Graeme
 Ioane Saula as Brody
 Warren Lee as Howin Liu
 Gabrielle Chan as Jing Liu
 Steve Rodgers as Warren Bostock

Episodes

Production
Doctor Doctor was commissioned for a fifth season on 31 March 2020 and was the first Australian drama series to be renewed amid the COVID-19 pandemic. Filming commenced on 28 September 2020, where social distancing requirements had been put in place.

Reception

Ratings

Awards and nominations

Logie Awards (2022)
 Nominated: Logie Award for Most Popular Actor – Roger Corser
 Nominated: Logie Award for Most Popular Drama Program

Screen Producers Australia Awards (2022)
 Nominated: SPA Award for Drama Series Production of the Year

Home media

International release

References

2021 Australian television seasons